Bourg-Madame is a commune in the Pyrénées-Orientales department in southern France.

Geography

Localisation 
Bourg-Madame is located in the canton of Les Pyrénées catalanes and in the arrondissement of Prades. It lies right on the border with Spain. It abuts directly onto the Spanish town of Puigcerdà, and is near the Spanish exclave of Llívia.

Toponymy 
The town used to be known in French as Les Guinguettes, until 1815 when it was renamed Bourg-Madame in honour of the wife of the Duke of Angoulême. The Catalan name for the town is still the traditional one.

History 
In the 20th century Bourg-Madame was the site of a camp housing Republican escapees from Spain at the end of the Spanish Civil War.

Government and politics

Mayors

Transport

Roads 
The following major roads lead to Bourg-Madame:

 N-20 from Ur to the north;
 N-154 and D-68 from the Spanish enclave Llívia to the northeast;
 N-116 from Saillagouse to the east;
 D-30 and D-70 from Osséja and Palau-de-Cerdagne to the southeast;
 N-152 from Puigcerdà to the west.

Railways 

Bourg-Madame is located at a key point of intersection for railways that link Toulouse, Barcelona, and Valencia (as well as Perpignan to the east via the Yellow Train).

The railway station is located in the Arena district.

Population

International relations
The commune is twinned with:
  Vespella de Gaià, Spain

See also
Communes of the Pyrénées-Orientales department

References

Communes of Pyrénées-Orientales
France–Spain border crossings